Ab Initio Software is an American multinational enterprise software corporation based in Lexington, Massachusetts. The company specializes in high-volume data processing applications and enterprise application integration. It was founded in 1995 by the former CEO of Thinking Machines Corporation, Sheryl Handler, and several other former employees after the bankruptcy of that company.

The Ab Initio products are provided on a platform for parallel data processing applications. These applications perform functions relating to fourth generation data analysis, batch processing, complex events, quantitative and qualitative data processing, data manipulation graphical user interface (GUI)-based parallel processing software which is commonly used to extract, transform, and load (ETL) data.

References

External links
 Official site
 The Ab Initio Professionals Group

Data warehousing products
Development software companies
Extract, transform, load tools
Companies based in Lexington, Massachusetts